Mycoplasmataceae is a family of bacteria in the order Mycoplasmatales. This family consists of the genera Mycoplasma and Ureaplasma.

In 1967, the order Mycoplasmatales was incorporated into the class Mollicutes. Many species are sexually transmitted and cause pelvic inflammatory disease.

Taxonomy

Mycoplasma

Mycoplasma refers to a genus of bacteria that lack a cell wall and possess a three-layered cellular membrane.  They can be parasitic or saprotrophic. Several species are sexually transmitted and pathogenic in humans. Others are found on cats, dogs, and barnyard fowl.

Ureaplasma
Ureaplasma is the second of two genera of bacteria belonging to the family Mycoplasmataceae. As the name implies, ureaplasma is urease positive. This genera is distinct from other genera in Mollicutes in that it hydrolyses urea for generation of ATP.

Ureaplasma spp. as human pathogens 
Both Ureaplasma urealyticum and Ureaplasma parvum have been identified as important human pathogens, causing infection in the urogenital tract and, rarely, at distal sites. Their role in neonatal disease and adverse pregnancy outcomes has been well established, and semantic classifications are changing to reflect the nature of the detrimental outcomes these infections are associated with. In the 2010s, Mycoplasma genitalium has been re-classified as an STI, and it is likely that with more research, Ureaplasma spp. will follow this trend. Similar to other pathogens such as Chlamydia trachomatis, infection with Ureaplasma spp. is associated with adverse fertility outcomes in both men and women. Both cause non-gonococcal urethritis. Ureaplasma spp. were implicated in conditions such as prostatitis and chronic pelvic pain syndrome as early as the 1980s. Research in women has lagged several decades behind, but it is now becoming more clear how Ureaplasma spp. contribute to etiologies such as interstitial cystitis/painful bladder syndrome. Ureaplasma spp. are associated with alterations in host environment that increase susceptibility to other infections such as bacterial vaginosis and vaginal candidiasis. Ureaplasma spp. can cause reactive arthritis as well as directly infect the synovium. Some case studies have suggested a causative role in complex regional pain syndrome/reflex sympathetic dystrophy syndrome.

Phylogeny

The currently accepted taxonomy is based on the List of Prokaryotic names with Standing in Nomenclature (LPSN) and National Center for Biotechnology Information (NCBI)

See also
 List of bacterial orders
 List of bacteria genera

References

External links 
Ureaplasma Infection: eMedicine Infectious Diseases

 
Mollicutes
Bacteria families